In music, a septimal diatonic semitone (or major diatonic semitone) is the interval 15:14 .  It is about 119.44 cents. The septimal diatonic semitone may be derived from the harmonic series as the interval between the fourteenth and fifteenth harmonics (B7b and B).

The septimal diatonic semitone equals a just diatonic semitone  (16:15, or 111.73 cents) plus a septimal kleisma (the interval 225:224, or 7.71 cents).

See also
Major diatonic semitone (5-limit, 16:15)
Minor diatonic semitone (or septendecimal diatonic semitone, 17:16).

References

Seconds (music)
7-limit tuning and intervals
0015:0014